Terotechnology (from Greek τηρεῖν tērein "to care for" and technology) is the technology of installation, including the efficient use and management of equipment. It also involves the use of technology to carry out maintenance functions in a bid to reduce cost and increase productivity.

Definition
The term goes back to the 1970s. Terotechnology is a system for the care of equipment. It includes the management, engineering, and financial expertise working together to improve the installation and operations.

In practice
It involves the reliability and maintainability of physical equipment regarding installation, operation, maintenance, or replacement. Decisions are influenced by feedback throughout the life cycle of a project. In 1992 the British Standards Institution published British Standard 3843: Guide to terotechnology. The standard was withdrawn in November 2011.

See also
 Asset management

References

External links

Collins English Dictionary – Complete and Unabridged, HarperCollins Publishers 1991, 1994, 1998, 2000, 2003

Engineering mechanics
Industrial design
Industrial processes
Maintenance